In Greek mythology, Elpenor (Ancient Greek: Ἐλπήνωρ, gen.: Ἐλπήνορος), also spelled Elpinor , was the youngest comrade of Odysseus.  While on the island of Circe, he became drunk and decided to spend the night on the roof.  In the morning he slipped on the ladder, fell, and broke his neck, dying instantly.

Mythology
Elpenor was not especially notable for his intelligence or strength, but he survived the Trojan War, and appears in the Odyssey. He is the youngest man to survive the Laestrygonians. While Odysseus was staying on Aeaea, Circe's island, Elpenor became drunk and climbed onto the roof of Circe's palace to sleep. The next morning, waking upon hearing his comrades making preparations to travel to Hades, he forgot he was on the roof and fell, breaking his neck, and died in the act.  Odysseus and his men apparently noticed his absence, but they were too busy to look for him. When Odysseus arrived in Hades, Elpenor was the first shade to meet Odysseus, and pleaded with him to return to Aeaea and give him a proper cremation and burial. After finishing his task in the underworld, Odysseus returned to Aeaea and cremated Elpenor's body, then buried him with his armour and marked the grave with an oar of his ship.

Later historic uses
The story of Elpenor can be described as a mirror to the story of Palinurus in Virgil's Aeneid. In the Aeneid, Palinurus, one of Aeneas' men, falls overboard and ends up swimming to an island nearby. He is killed on the island by the natives that live there. Later on in the story, Aeneas travels to the underworld where he sees Palinurus. There, Palinurus pleads with Aeneas to give him a proper burial.

The story of Eutychus in the New Testament may be based on Elpenor.

Modern uses
The character of Patrick "Paddy" Dignam, whose funeral is the focus of Episode 6 ("Hades") of Ulysses by James Joyce, is a modern counterpart to Elpenor. This chapter of Ulysses is a main inspiration for the film Bye Bye Braverman.

Elpenor is the subject of the short novel Elpénor by Jean Giraudoux, published in 1919, which retells some of the stories of the Odyssey in humorous fashion.

Derek Mahon suggests Elpenor (but does not name him specifically) in his poem "Lives". Mahon talks of a decaying oar, planted in a beach, thinking of Ithaca. Ezra Pound references Elpenor in his poem Hugh Selwyn Mauberley by having the eponymous poet's grave marked by an oar, with an epitaph that recalls Elpenor's. Pound also makes use of Elpenor in the first of his Cantos: "But first Elpenor came, our friend Elpenor / Unburied, cast on the wide earth, / Limbs that we left in the house of Circe, / Unwept, unwrapped in sepulchre, since toils urged other."

Archibald MacLeish wrote an epic poem about Elpenor published in 1933. Nobel laureate Giorgos Seferis wrote a poem "Sensual Elpenor". Takis Sinopoulos also wrote a poem called "Elpenor".

The video game Rock of Ages 3: Make and Break, has a story mode where Elpenor is the main protagonist, after Odysseus (the traditional hero of Homer's epic poem the Odyssey) is flattened by the eponymous Rock of Ages.

References

Characters in the Odyssey